Gajevci is a roadside village on the left bank of the Drava River east of Ptuj in northeastern Slovenia. It lies in the Municipality of Gorišnica. The area traditionally belonged to the Styria region. It is now included in the Drava Statistical Region.

There is a small chapel-shrine in the settlement. It was built in 1911.

References

External links
Gajevci on Geopedia

Populated places in the Municipality of Gorišnica